Cristian Cauz (born 15 August 1996) is an Italian football player. He plays for  club Reggiana.

Club career
He made his Serie C debut for Pro Piacenza on 18 October 2015 in a game against Pavia.

On 29 July 2019, he joined Serie B side Trapani on loan.

On 16 January 2020, he signed a 1.5-year contract with Serie C club Ravenna.

On 10 August 2020, he moved to Lecco.

On 21 July 2021, he joined to Reggiana.

References

External links
 

1996 births
People from Pordenone
Footballers from Friuli Venezia Giulia
Living people
Italian footballers
Association football defenders
Pordenone Calcio players
A.S. Pro Piacenza 1919 players
U.S. Massese 1919 players
Piacenza Calcio 1919 players
Trapani Calcio players
Ravenna F.C. players
Calcio Lecco 1912 players
A.C. Reggiana 1919 players
Serie B players
Serie C players
Serie D players